Joseph Walter Jackson (July 26, 1928 – June 27, 2018) was an American talent manager and patriarch of the Jackson family of entertainers. He was inducted into the Rhythm and Blues Music Hall of Fame in 2014.

Early life and ancestry
Joseph Walter Jackson was born in Fountain Hill, Arkansas to Crystal Lee (née King; May 1907–November 4, 1992) and Samuel Joseph Jackson (April 4, 1893 – October 31, 1993) on July 26, 1928. His father was a teacher. According to the Arkansas Black Hall of Fame and Katherine Jackson's book My Family, The Jacksons, his year of birth was 1929. He was the eldest of five children. His great-grandfather, July "Jack" Gale, was a US Army scout; he was also claimed to be an Indigenous American medicine man.

Jackson recalled from his early childhood that his father was domineering and strict, and he described himself in his memoir The Jacksons as a "lonely child that had only few friends". After his parents separated when he was twelve, his mother, two brothers, and sister moved to East Chicago, Indiana, a suburb outside Chicago in Northwest Indiana, while he moved with his father to Oakland, California. When he was 18, his father remarried, and he moved to East Chicago to live with his mother, two brothers, and sister. He soon got a job in East Chicago at Inland Steel Company but did not finish high school. While in East Chicago, he began to pursue his dreams of becoming a boxer and found success with the Golden Gloves program. While he was preparing for a professional boxing career, he met 17-year-old Katherine Scruse, who also lived in East Chicago and attended Washington High School. Joe was married to another woman, but was divorced in less than a year before he started dating Katherine.

Joseph and Katherine were married on November 5, 1949; in January 1950, they purchased a small two-bedroom home on 2300 Jackson Street near East Chicago in Gary, Indiana. Their first child, Maureen Reillette "Rebbie" Jackson, was born four months later on May 29, 1950, in the Jackson house. Still employed at Inland Steel, Jackson left his hopes of becoming a professional boxer in order to support his family, and began working there as a full-time crane operator. He later took a second part-time job at American Foundries in East Chicago. In the meantime, his wife Katherine tended to their growing family. During the late 1950s, she began working part-time at Sears in Gary. Joseph and Katherine went on to raise ten children, as their son Brandon Jackson (Marlon's twin) died just after he was born.

During the early 1950s, Jackson briefly performed with his younger brother Luther Jackson in their own blues band The Falcons, playing guitar. Despite their efforts, The Falcons did not get a recording deal and subsequently broke up after one of their members, Thornton "Pookie" Hudson, founded his own band in 1952. That band became a successful doo-wop group named The Spaniels.

The Jackson 5

In the early 1960s, Joe Jackson began pushing his sons in a musical direction after they began playing around with his musical instruments while he was at work. He then first started working with his three eldest sons Jackie, Tito, and Jermaine. Younger sons Marlon and Michael were eventually put into the band; youngest brother Randy was too young to join at the time. Joseph began enforcing long and intense rehearsals for his sons. At first, the group went under the name The Jackson Brothers. Following the inclusions of Marlon and Michael in the group, their name was changed to The Jackson 5. After a couple of years performing in local talent contests and high school functions, The Jackson 5 got a color TV set after the judges placed them in second place. Joseph booked them in more professional venues, including in Chicago, and they eventually landed a gig at the Apollo Theater in New York City. On November 21, 1967, The Jackson 5 were signed by Joe Jackson to their first record contract with Gordon Keith, owner and first president of Steeltown Records in Gary, Indiana. The group's first single "Big Boy," with Michael as the lead singer, was released by Steeltown on January 31, 1968. "Big Boy" did not become a hit but because the brothers actually had a single released, they became local celebrities in Gary after it received some airplay on local Gary radio stations. Within the year, Jackson helped to land his sons an audition for Motown Records. The Jackson 5 received a record contract with Motown in March 1969.

Shortly after, Joe Jackson moved his family to the Los Angeles area and sat in on every recording session the group made for Motown. The group received nationwide attention after their first single for Motown, "I Want You Back", hit No. 1 following its release on October 7, 1969, and included on their first album, Diana Ross Presents The Jackson 5, in December 1969. The group saw the release of their first three albums and their first four singles, "I Want You Back" (1969), "ABC" (1970), "The Love You Save" (1970), and "I'll Be There" (1970), reach No. 1 in the US within 10 months. In 1973, wanting to reassert his control, Jackson had his family, including youngest son Randy, and daughters Rebbie, La Toya, and Janet, perform at casinos and resorts in the Las Vegas area, inspired by the success of fellow family act The Osmonds.

Joseph had also formed his own record label 'Ivory Tower International Records' and signed artists under his management in which they toured internationally with The Jackson 5 as opening acts in 1974. In 1975, the group left Motown Records and signed a contract with Epic Records, with the exception of Jermaine, who remained at Motown as a solo artist. Jermaine was replaced in the group by brother Randy. Michael also had a separate deal with Epic to release solo albums. Unbeknownst to Joe Jackson or the group, Motown president Berry Gordy had copyrighted the group's name The Jackson 5. This came to light as the group was signing its new contract with Epic Records and Gordy refused to allow them to use the name The Jackson 5 with their new label. The group renamed themselves The Jacksons. In 1978, Joseph's youngest son Randy released his solo single "How Can I Be Sure" on Joseph's record label. In 1982, Joseph established Janet Jackson's career as an actress and as a recording artist while managing her. He financed the recording of Janet's first demo and arranged a recording contract for her with A&M Records.

Marriage 

In his early 20s, while moonlighting in a blues band with his brother Luther, Joe met Katherine Scruse, whom he married in November 1949. This was his second marriage, following a brief marriage that was annulled.

Joseph was alleged to have had a lasting extramarital affair. Katherine filed for divorce on March 9, 1973, with a Los Angeles County clerk, but she decided to drop the divorce proceedings. The following year, Joseph fathered a daughter with Cheryle Terrell named Joh'Vonnie. This led Joseph and Cheryle to a 25-year-long affair while raising Joh'Vonnie. Katherine attempted once again to divorce her husband in 1982, but again was persuaded to drop the action. Joseph then moved to Las Vegas, with Katherine remaining at the Jackson family home Hayvenhurst in Encino, California. Despite living separately, Katherine and Joe remained legally married until his death in 2018. Katherine denied rumors that she and Joseph were estranged.

Children
Jackson had eleven children, ten with his wife Katherine and one with Cheryle.

Maureen Reillette "Rebbie" Jackson (born May 29, 1950)
Sigmund Esco "Jackie" Jackson (born May 4, 1951)
Toriano Adaryll "Tito" Jackson (born October 15, 1953)
Jermaine La Jaune Jackson (born December 11, 1954)
La Toya Yvonne Jackson (born May 29, 1956)
Marlon David Jackson (born March 12, 1957)
 Brandon David Jackson (March 12, 1957 – March 12, 1957)
Michael Joseph Jackson (August 29, 1958 – June 25, 2009)
Steven Randall "Randy" Jackson (born October 29, 1961)
Janet Damita Jo Jackson (born May 16, 1966)
Joh'Vonnie Nakia Jeboo Jackson (born August 30, 1974)

Public image
In the late 1980s, Joseph's image as a father became tarnished as the media reported stories told by his children that he was abusive toward them. When he managed his family, he allegedly ordered each of them to call him "Joseph", which contributed to several siblings having been estranged from him. Michael claimed that from a young age he was physically and emotionally abused by his father, enduring incessant rehearsals, whippings and name-calling, but also said that his father's strict discipline played a large part in his success. Michael first spoke openly about his childhood abuse in a 1993 interview with Oprah Winfrey. He said that during his childhood, he often cried from loneliness. Michael recalled that Joseph sat in a chair with a belt in his hand as Michael and his siblings rehearsed and that "if you didn't do it the right way, he would tear you up, really get you." Joseph admitted to whipping his children with switches and belts as punishment, but said he did not do so at random, and claimed never to have used any hard object as he felt was implied by the word "beating."

Both Joe and Katherine have denied the characterization of abuse. Katherine said that the whippings and physical punishments were common back then when Michael and his siblings grew up. Other siblings, Jackie, Tito, Jermaine and Marlon, have denied that their father was abusive. Despite the allegations, Michael honored his father with an annual "Joseph Jackson Day" at Neverland Ranch and ultimately forgave him, noting that Joseph's difficult upbringing in the Great Depression and the Jim Crow South, along with his working-class adulthood, hardened him emotionally and made him push his children to succeed as entertainers.

Joe was played by Lawrence Hilton-Jacobs in the mini-series The Jacksons: An American Dream and by Frederic Tucker in the 2004 VH1 biopic Man in the Mirror: The Michael Jackson Story. He was voiced by Tom Kenny in the 2000 web cartoon Murry Wilson: Rock N' Roll Dad.

Later years

In 2011, Jackson was inducted into the Arkansas Black Hall of Fame. In 2014, when his late son Michael was posthumously inducted into the Rhythm and Blues Music Hall of Fame with a Lifetime Achievement Award, Jackson accepted the award on his behalf. The following year Jackson himself was awarded the organization's Humanitarian Award. In June 2015, Jackson appeared at the BET Awards 2015 with his daughter Janet as she accepted the Ultimate Icon Award.

On July 27, 2015, Jackson was rushed to a hospital after a stroke and heart arrhythmia while celebrating his 87th birthday in Brazil. He was not stable enough to fly out of the country for further treatment until two weeks later. Upon his arrival to Los Angeles on August 11, he was treated at the Cedars-Sinai Medical Center to correct his blurred vision following the stroke. In January 2017, Jackson's brother Lawrence died.

Death and burial 
On June 22, 2018, TMZ reported that Jackson was hospitalized in Las Vegas in the final stages of terminal pancreatic cancer. He died at a hospice in Las Vegas at 3:30 a.m. (PDT) on June 27, two days after the ninth anniversary of his son Michael's death and less than a month before his 90th birthday. He was surrounded by his wife and surviving children.

On July 2, 2018, Jackson was interred at Forest Lawn Memorial Park in Glendale near Los Angeles, the same Southern California cemetery as his son Michael, who was buried there in 2009.

References

External links

 Official website for Joseph Jackson 
 Profile at German branch of Random House
 Encyclopedia of Arkansas History & Culture entry

1928 births
2018 deaths
20th-century American guitarists
20th-century American male musicians
African-American male guitarists
African-American record producers
American autobiographers
American blues guitarists
American male guitarists
American music managers
American people who self-identify as being of Native American descent
American rhythm and blues guitarists
American talent agents
Burials at Forest Lawn Memorial Park (Glendale)
Deaths from cancer in Nevada
Deaths from pancreatic cancer
Guitarists from Arkansas
Guitarists from Indiana
Guitarists from Los Angeles
Jackson family (show business)
People from Ashley County, Arkansas
People from East Chicago, Indiana
People from Gary, Indiana
People from Los Angeles
People from the Las Vegas Valley
Record producers from Arkansas
Record producers from California
Record producers from Indiana